The Women's United States Squash Open 2021 was the women's edition of the 2021 United States Open (squash), which was a 2021–22 PSA World Tour Platinum event (prize money: $150,000). The event took place at the Arlen Specter US Squash Center in Philadelphia, Pennsylvania in the United States from the 1st of October to the 6th of October.

Nouran Gohar of Egypt was the reigning champion and won her second US Open title by beating fellow Egyptian player Hania El Hammamy in the final with a score of 9–11, 11–9, 11–7, 11–3.

Seeds

Draw and results

Semi finals and final

Main draw

Top half

Bottom half

See also
 Men's United States Open (squash) 2021

References

Women's United States Open
Squash in the United States
United States Open
United States Open
United States Open